The Kandy House is a nine-room, 200-year-old manor house which was built by the last Chief Minister of the Kandyan Kingdom in 1804. It was fully restored and opened in 2005 as an upmarket boutique hotel, situated 20 minutes from Kandy. Described as a "showcase of the island's architectural renaissance", it has established a reputation as "the best small hotel in Sri Lanka".

History 
The Kandy Hotel is also known as "Amunugama Walauwa" or "Ratwatte Walauwa" was built in 1804 by the Chief Minister, Ratwatte Adigar, to the last King of Kandy. The kingdom at that time forbade any but the royal residences to use roofing tiles but the ambitious Ratwatte Adigar, had the nerve to build himself a replica palace with two sprawling stories of terracotta tiles. Two hundred years on, Geoffrey Bawa's protégé Channa Daswatte began work on a sensitive restoration  that has kept the essence of the villa intact but brought it into the 21st century.

Notable guests 
Madhur Jaffrey
Gillian Anderson
Prince Michael of Kent and Princess Michael of Kent
Joanna Trollope

Facilities 
Swimming Pool 
Inhouse dining facilities 
Yoga Lessons

Awards 
Condé Nast Traveler Hot List 2006

References

External links 
 The Kandy House website
 The Ratwatte Ancestry

2005 establishments in Sri Lanka
Country houses in Sri Lanka
Hotels established in 2005
Hotels in Kandy
Houses completed in 1804
Houses in Kandy